Ultima Lucha (Spanish for "Final Fight") was a professional wrestling event that aired as the season finale of the Lucha Underground television series. The event was created in 2015 to be Lucha Undergrounds premier event of the year, similar to WWE's WrestleMania event.

History
On March 25, 2015, it was announced that Lucha Underground would be holding their first major event in early August 2015 entitled Ultima Lucha.

Events

See also
 WrestleMania, the premier event produced by WWE
 Starrcade, the premier event produced by the defunct World Championship Wrestling
 November to Remember, the premier event produced by the defunct Extreme Championship Wrestling
 Bound for Glory, the premier event produced by Impact Wrestling
 Final Battle, the premier event produced by Ring of Honor
 January 4 Tokyo Dome Show, the premier event produced by New Japan Pro-Wrestling
 CMLL Anniversary Show, the premier event produced by Consejo Mundial de Lucha Libre
 Triplemanía, the premier event produced by Lucha Libre AAA World Wide
 King of Trios, the premier event produced by Chikara

References

Professional wrestling in Los Angeles
Lucha Underground shows
Recurring events established in 2015